Moutet is a French surname. Notable people with the surname include:

Corentin Moutet (born 1999), French tennis player
Marius Moutet (1876–1968), French Socialist politician and Minister for Colonies
Anne-Elisabeth Moutet (born 1965), French-British journalist and author

French-language surnames